Augustin Bourbonnais (March 19, 1850 – August 5, 1923) was a Canadian physician and politician.

Born in Saint-Clet, Soulanges County, Canada East, the son of Michel Bourbonnais and Angèle Houle, Bourbonnais was educated at the Seminary of Sainte-Thérèse, where he graduated a B.A. in 1872. He studied medicine at Laval University and became an M.D. in 1875. He first practised at Syracuse, New York and moved to Coteau Landing, Quebec.  He was first elected to the House of Commons of Canada for the riding of Soulanges in the general elections of 1896. A Liberal, he was re-elected in 1900 and 1904. He was defeated in 1908.

His younger brother, Avila-Gonzague Bourbonnais, was a member of the Legislative Assembly of Quebec from 1886 to 1902.

References
 
 The Canadian Parliament; biographical sketches and photo-engravures of the senators and members of the House of Commons of Canada. Being the tenth Parliament, elected November 3, 1904
  Avila-Gonzague BOURBONNAIS at Assemblée nationale du Québec

Notes

1850 births
1923 deaths
Liberal Party of Canada MPs
Members of the House of Commons of Canada from Quebec